Jeram is a mukim in Kuala Selangor District, Selangor, Malaysia.

Jeram may also refer to:

 Jeram, California, former settlement in Mendocino County
 Jeram (state constituency), in Selangor, Malaysia
 Anita Jeram (born 1965), English author and illustrator of picture books
 Praven Jeram (fl. 1971–1977), New Zealand football goalkeeper